Horror of the Zombies is the second full-length album by American band Impetigo. It was the last album the band has released since their 2007 live album, which was recorded at their reunion show in Chicago.

Track listing
"Boneyard" (intro from serial killer Henry Lee Lucas talking about his acts)
"I Work For The Streetcleaner" (intro from Jim Van Bebber's Deadbeat at Dawn, 1987)
"Wizard Of Gore" (intro from Herschell Gordon Lewis's The Wizard of Gore, 1970)
"Mortuaria" (intro from the movie Andy Warhol's Flesh for Frankenstein, 1973)
"Cannibale Ballet"
"Trap Them And Kill Them"
"Cannibal Lust" (intro from the movie Cannibal Holocaust, 1980) 
"Defiling The Grave" (intro from an interview with murderer Daniel Rakowitz done by Geraldo Rivera)
"Staph Terrorist" (intro from the Japanese gore movie Guinea Pig 2: Flowers of Flesh and Blood, 1985) 
"Breakfast At The Manchester Morgue" (intro from Let Sleeping Corpses Lie, 1974)

Outro at the end is some kid who called into some Christian talk show hosted by Bob Larson.

Notes
The album was re-released on CD by Razorback Records and includes original cover and alternate cover.

Impetigo (band) albums
1992 albums